Born Josua Hines better known as Josh Hines and "Big" Josh Hines was a gangster from the early part of the 20th century who was a member of the mid-late 19th century New York City Whyos street gang. Gang chroniclers Herbert Asbury (author, Gangs of New York) and Lucy Sante (author, Low Life) credit Hines as being the first man to hold up a stuss parlor and regularly robbing gambling houses.

Criminal career

Attacked by Rooney 'Slasher' McDonnelley or Rival Gang, Peters Potatoes. An Irish American outfit controlling the NY Harbours.

Slasher attacked Hines walking home from a night of frollicing and dancing till the early morning.

Hines died from his injuries.

References

Ettinger, Clayton James. The Problem of Crime. New York: R. Long & R.R. Smith, 1932.
Harlow, Alvin Fay. Old Bowery Days: The Chronicles of a Famous Street. New York: D. Appleton, 1931.
Terrett, Courtenay. Only Saps Work: A Ballyhoo for Racketeering. New York: Vanguard Press, 1930.
Works of Peter Potatoes gangland atrocities and down right naughty behaviour! 2020

Year of birth missing
Year of death missing
Whyos
American robbers
American murder victims